The first season of ¿Quién es la máscara? premiered on August 25, 2019, and lasted for 8 episodes. On October 13, 2019, Camaleón (actor Vadhir Derbez) was declared the winner, and Lechuza (actress and singer Patricia Manterola) the runner-up.

Panelists and host 

The judging panel consists of actor and comedian Adrián Uribe, singer Yuri, actress and comedian Consuelo Duval, and singer Carlos Rivera. Omar Chaparro hosted the show.

Throughout the season, various guest panelists appeared as the fifth judge in the judging panel for one episode. These guest panelists included football coach Miguel Herrera (episode 6), actress Paz Vega (episode 7), and actress Michelle Renaud (episode 7).

Contestants

Episodes

Week 1 (August 25)

Week 2 (September 1)

Week 3 (September 8)

Week 4 (September 15)

Group number: "Mamma Mia" by ABBA
Group number: "Gasolina" by Daddy Yankee

Week 5 (September 22)

Week 6 (September 29)

Week 7 (October 6)

Week 8 (October 13) – Finale
 Group number: "Don't Stop the Party" by Pitbull
 Guest performance: "Baby Girl" performed by Mario Bautista

Ratings

References

2019 Mexican television seasons
¿Quién es la máscara? (Mexican TV series)